R-Ladies is an organization that promotes gender diversity in the community of users of the R statistical programming language. It is made up of local chapters affiliated with the worldwide coordinating organization R-Ladies Global.

History 
On October 1, 2012, Gabriela de Queiroz, a data scientist, founded R-Ladies in San Francisco (United States) after participating in similar free initiatives through Meetup. In the following four years, three other groups started: Taipei in 2014, Minneapolis (called “Twin Cities”) in 2015, and London in 2016. The chapters were independent until the 2016 useR! Conference, where it was agreed to create a central coordinating organization. In that year, Gabriela de Queiroz and Erin LeDell of R-Ladies San Francisco; Chiin-Rui Tan, Alice Daish, Hannah Frick, Rachel Kirkham and Claudia Vitolo of R-Ladies London; as well as Heather Turner joined to apply for a grant from the R Consortium, with which they asked for support for the global expansion of the organization.

In September 2016, with this scholarship, R-Ladies Global was founded and in 2018 it was declared as a high-level project by the R Consortium. As of 2019, the RLadies Global community consists of 178 groups in 48 countries.

Organization 
R-Ladies meetings are organized around workshops and talks, led by people that identify as female or as gender minorities (including but not limited to cis/trans women, trans men, non-binary, genderqueer, agender, pangender, two-spirt, gender-fluid, neutrois). The organization is coordinated, but decentralized, and new chapters can be founded by anyone using the publicly available “starter-kit”.

R-Ladies groups aim to promote a culture of inclusion within their events and community. In addition, they promote gender equality and diversity in conferences, in the workplace, collaboration among gender minorities, and analysis of data about women.

R-Ladies also collaborates with other projects, such as NASA Datanauts.

Gabriela de Queiroz
Gabriela de Queiroz is a chief data scientist at IBM, the founder of the global R-Ladies and AI Inclusive organizations. She was raised in Brazil and received her bachelor's degree in statistics from Rio de Janeiro State University. She has a master’s in epidemiology at Oswaldo Cruz Foundation and another one in statistics at California State University, East Bay.

de Queiroz moved to the United States in 2012 to begin her master's degree in statistics at California State University, East Bay. Interested in creating an inclusive space for women learning the programming language R, she began a Meetup group in the San Francisco Bay area. Since then, the R-Ladies organization has grown to more than 178 groups in 48 countries.

In addition to her work with R-Ladies, de Queiroz is an expert in machine learning and leads IBM's AI Strategy and Innovations team. Her team contributes to projects such as TensorFlow.

Notable members

References 

Women in computing
R (programming language)